Benjamin's Department Store, also known as Peebles Department Store, is a historic commercial building located at Exmore, Northampton County, Virginia. It was built about 1910, and is a three-story, brick building in the Italianate style located at the most prominent corner at the core of the town. It features a metal cornice and storefronts on the west and south elevations.

It was listed on the National Register of Historic Places in 2006.

References

Commercial buildings on the National Register of Historic Places in Virginia
Italianate architecture in Virginia
Commercial buildings completed in 1910
Buildings and structures in Northampton County, Virginia
National Register of Historic Places in Northampton County, Virginia
Department stores on the National Register of Historic Places
1910 establishments in Virginia